Rathcoole, also spelled Rathcool is a village in the north west of County Cork, Ireland. It is in civil parish of Dromtarrife in the barony of Duhallow. Rathcoole is within the Dáil constituency of Cork North-West.

Location and amenities
Rathcoole is located south of the River Blackwater inbetween Millstreet and Banteer. Rathcoole once had a train station on the Mallow–Tralee line but it closed in 1963. The nearest station is now Banteer railway station. There is a primary school located in the village called St. Brendan's national school.

Sport
In Gaelic football and hurling, Dromtarriffe GAA club represents Rathcoole, and the club's sports ground is located just outside the village.

Rathcoole also has a soccer team called Rathcoole Rovers F.C.

Aerodrome

Rathcoole Aerodrome is located 1 km north of the village, and there is a community-funded rescue helicopter located there.

References

Towns and villages in County Cork